Jethro Fitzgerald Franklin (born October 25, 1965) is an American football coach and former player who most recently was the defensive line coach for the Missouri Tigers.

Playing career
Franklin was born in St. Nazaire, France, while his father was stationed in the US military.  He grew up in San Jose, California, attended Yerba Buena High School.  He attended San Jose City College, a junior college, where he played both years and earned junior college All-American honors in 1985.   He transferred to Fresno State University, where he played for two seasons.  While playing for the Bulldogs he earned All-American second-team honors both seasons, set a then-school record with 19.5 sacks his junior season, and was the Pacific Coast Conference Defensive Player of the Year and Fresno State's MVP as a 1987 senior. He graduated from Fresno State with a bachelor's degree in criminology in 1988.

In the 1988 NFL Draft, Franklin was drafted in the 11th round (298th overall) by the Houston Oilers.  He did not play for the Oilers, but played defensive line for the Seattle Seahawks in the 1989 season.  He then was the No. 1 draft choice of the San Antonio Riders of the World League of American Football in 1991, but instead opted to begin his coaching career.

Coaching career

Fresno State
Franklin returned to Fresno State to coach the defensive line from 1991–1998, this term included a pair of NFL coaching fellowships, working with the Buffalo Bills in the summer of 1994 and the Cleveland Browns in the summer of 1995.

UCLA
In 1999, he coached the interior defensive line for UCLA.

Green Bay Packers
He then served as Defensive Line Coach for the Green Bay Packers from 2000–2004.

USC
He coached the defensive line for USC during the 2005 season. He coached for the Tampa Bay Buccaneers in 2006.

Houston Texans
He was a member of the Houston Texans from 2007 to 2008.

USC
Franklin returned to USC as the defensive line coach in 2009.

Temple University
He moved to coach the Defensive line at Temple Owls.

University of Miami
In 2011, he moved with Al Golden to the Miami Hurricanes.

Oakland Raiders
On February 6, 2015, he joined the Oakland Raiders.

Seattle Seahawks
On January 31, 2018, Franklin joined the Seattle Seahawks as assistant defensive line coach.

References

External links
Miami Bio Page
USC bio page

1965 births
Living people
American football defensive linemen
Fresno State Bulldogs football players
Seattle Seahawks players
Fresno State Bulldogs football coaches
UCLA Bruins football coaches
Green Bay Packers coaches
USC Trojans football coaches
Tampa Bay Buccaneers coaches
Houston Texans coaches
Miami Hurricanes football coaches
Oakland Raiders coaches
Seattle Seahawks coaches
Players of American football from San Jose, California